The Collège du Saint Esprit is a private catholic secondary school in Mauritius. It is one of the most prestigious and competitive secondary education institutions in the country. The school consists of a boys-only department in Quatre Bornes where students are prepared for the School Certificate, the Higher School Certificate and other courses

History 

The secondary school was founded in January 1938 by Fathers of the Congregation of The Holy Spirit. In 1920, The 'Séminaire Père Laval' was inaugurated and in 1926 'le Collège Père Laval' was founded with priests as teachers. However, due to a lack of priests, 'le Collège Père Laval' closed its doors and it was only in 1938 that the college re-opened its doors as le Collège du Saint Esprit. In 1950, the college obtained its first laureate (Roland LAMUSSE). In 1972, l’Abbé Adrien WIEHE became the first Mauritian rector of the school and four years later there was the beginning of the secular administration with Mr Cyril LECKNING as rector of the college. The second secular rector was Mr Raymond RIVET in 1987 who was then succeeded by Mr Georges HO WAN KAU in 1995. Mr Jacques MALIE became Rector in 2000.

Summary of the history of the college 
 1920 - Le Séminaire Père Laval was inaugurated.
 1926 - le Collège Père Laval was founded.
 1930 - Due to a lack of priests, le Collège Père Laval closed his doors.
 1938 - Le Collège Père Laval became le Collège du Saint Esprit.
 1950 - First laureate: Roland LAMUSSE.
 1972 - First Mauritian Rector: l’Abbé Adrien WIEHE.
 1976 - Beginning of the secular administration, Mr Cyril LECKNING, Rector.
 1987 - Mr Raymond RIVET, 2nd secular rector.
 1995 - Mr Georges HO WAN KAU, is nominated Rector and Mr Edmond MAUREL, Manager.
 2000 - Mr Jacques MALIE became Rector.
 2003 - The C.S.E Junior School became le Collège Saint Louis.
 2005 - The Collège Saint Louis is dissolved and C.S.E Junior School is reinstated.
 2016 - Mr Lindsay Thomas becomes Rector following retirement of Mr Jacques Malié as Rector
 2017 - First Mauritian High School to participate in Google Code-in 5 students participated Neel GOPAUL, Nigel YONG, Heesen PONNUSAWMY, Heervesh LALLBAHADUR and Ashmith Kifah Sheik MEERAN. The last 2 being finalists for Drupal: .
 2020 - Mrs Dominique Séblin becomes first female Rector following transfer of Mr Lindsay Thomas

C.S.E Junior School 

The C.S.E Junior School welcomes students after their admission till form 4 and students then complete their study from form 5 to Upper 6 at the old building which is the central branch. The college also accepts high-graded students who just finished their School Certificate and want to complete their study Higher School Certificate at the Collège du Saint Esprit.

Notable alumni 
 Paul Bérenger, former Prime Minister of Mauritius and former Opposition Leader
 Maurice Piat, Cardinal and Bishop of Port-Louis
 Victor Glover, former Chief Justice
 Shakeel Mohamed, former Minister and lawyer
 Michael James Kevin Glover, former Minister
 Yogida Sawmynaden, former Minister

See also 

 Education in Mauritius
 List of secondary schools in Mauritius

References 

Secondary schools in Mauritius
Educational institutions established in 1938
1938 establishments in Mauritius